Speaking of Murder is a 1957 French crime film directed by Gilles Grangier and starring Jean Gabin. The original French title is Le rouge est mis, which means "the red light is on". The screenplay is based on a novel by Auguste Le Breton.

Plot
Louis Bertain (Gabin) is the owner of a Paris garage which is the front for a robbery gang. He and his accomplices are careful to keep up a civic veneer by day, indulging in criminal activities only when "the red light is on" at night. This status quo is upset when one of the gang members becomes convinced that Louis' younger brother is a police informer.

Cast
 Jean Gabin as Louis Bertain / Louis le Blond 
 Paul Frankeur as Frédo
 Marcel Bozzuffi as Pierre Bertain
 Lino Ventura as Pepito
 Annie Girardot as Hélène
 Albert Dinan as Inspector Pluvier
 Antonin Berval as Zé
 Jean-Pierre Mocky as Pierre
 Thomy Bourdelle as Inspector
 Serge Lecointe as Bébert

References

External links
 
 
  Speaking of Murder at “Cinema-francais“ (French)
 Speaking of Murder movie review at The New York Times Last accessed: July 3, 2014.

1957 films
1950s crime thriller films
French black-and-white films
Film noir
French crime thriller films
Films set in Paris
1950s French-language films
French gangster films
Films about organized crime in France
Films based on French novels
Films based on works by Auguste Le Breton
Films with screenplays by Michel Audiard
1950s French films